Kevin Fernando Long (born January 20, 1955) is a former American football running back who played in the National Football League (NFL) and the United States Football League (USFL).

College
Kevin Long attended University of South Carolina and was a standout fullback for the Gamecocks. He rushed for 2,372 yards, 8th overall on Carolina's all-time list as of 2006. His average per rush was 5.3 yards and he was the first Gamecock player to compile 1,000 yards in a season (1975). In 2002, Kevin was inducted into the University of South Carolina Athletic Hall of Fame, and in 2003, into the State of South Carolina Athletic Hall of Fame.

NFL/USFL
Kevin was drafted in the 7th round (195th overall) by the New York Jets in the 1977 NFL Draft and played five solid seasons for the Jets, until 1981. However, he is probably best remembered as a former USFL player. He played three seasons in the newly formed league, first for the Chicago Blitz in 1983, and then for the Arizona Wranglers in 1984. Due to the full-team trade that occurred during the first off-season between Chicago and Arizona, the 1984 Arizona team was basically the same team that had played in Chicago in 1983. After the 1984 season, Arizona then merged with the Oklahoma Outlaws franchise, and Kevin played for the new Arizona Outlaws team in 1985.

Current status
Today, Kevin works in sales for a vending machine company. He is married and has three daughters. His eldest daughter won a track and field scholarship to the University of Georgia. His second daughter plays volleyball at the College of Charleston.

External links
 NFL Profile
 PFR Profile

References
 Daily Gamecock article
 1983 USFL Statistics
 Small profile on Kevin Long

1955 births
Living people
People from Clinton, South Carolina
Players of American football from South Carolina
American football running backs
South Carolina Gamecocks football players
New York Jets players
Chicago Blitz players
Arizona Wranglers players